Nagorny is a rural locality (a village) in Krasnooktyabrskoye Rural Settlement, Gus-Khrustalny District, Vladimir Oblast, Russia. The population was 1 as of 2010.

Geography 
Nagorny is located on the Gus River, 34 km south of Gus-Khrustalny (the district's administrative centre) by road. Krasny Posyolok is the nearest rural locality.

References 

Rural localities in Gus-Khrustalny District